Skorkov is a municipality and village in Mladá Boleslav District in the Central Bohemian Region of the Czech Republic. It has about 600 inhabitants.

Administrative parts
Villages of Otradovice and Podbrahy are administrative parts of Skorkov.

Geography
It lies in a flat landscape, mostly belonging into the Central Elbe Table. The municipality is situated on the right bank of the Jizera River, which flows along the eastern municipal border.

History
The first written mention of Skorkov is from 1332. Otradovice and Podbrahy were first mentioned in 1788.

Transport
The D10 motorway runs along the northern municipal border.

Sights
The main landmark and the oldest building of Skorkov is the Church of Saint John the Baptist. It was first documented in 1359. After it was damaged during the Thirty Years' War, it was rebuilt in 1690. The bell tower was added in 1689 and rebuilt into its current form in 1873. Next to the church is a Renaissance ossuary.

References

External links

Villages in Mladá Boleslav District